The following is a list of fictional media portraying eating disorders as a prominent or main theme (excluding brief trivial and non-notable mentions). List is categorized by media type and title in alphabetical order. This list is non-exhaustive and may not include all fictional works on the subject matter, including self-published content, international media, recently-released media and non-notable content.

Films
 Abzurdah (2015 Argentine film)
 Feed (2017 American film)
 For the Love of Nancy (1994 American film)
 Heathers (1988 American film)
 Heavy (1995 American film)
 Kate's Secret (1986 American film)
 My Skinny Sister (2015 Swedish film)
 Perfect Body (1997 American film)
 Sharing the Secret (2000 American film)
 Spencer (2021 British-American film)
 Starving in Suburbia (2014 American film)
 The Best Little Girl in the World (1981 American TV movie)
 The Neon Demon (2016 American film)
 Thinner (1996 American film)
 To the Bone (2017 American film)
 Vincent Wants to Sea (2010 German film)
 When Friendship Kills (1996 American film)

Television
 Calendar Girl (DC Comics): character created by Paul Dini for The New Batman Adventures
 Slim Obsession (1984 Canadian TV short)

Books
 Fat Chance (1994 novel by Lesléa Newman)
 Girls Under Pressure (1998 novel by Dame Jacqueline Wilson)
 How I Live Now (2004 novel by Meg Rosoff)
 Hunger for Life (2019 novel by Andy Marr)
 Killing Aurora (1999 novel by Helen Barnes)
 Kim: Empty Inside: The Diary of an Anonymous Teenager (2002 novel by Beatrice Sparks)
 Letting Ana Go (2013 novel by Anonymous)
 Life in the Fat Lane (1998 novel by Cherie Bennett)
 Life-Size (1992 novel by Jenefer Shute)
 Perfect (2002 novel by Natasha Friend)
 Skinny (2004 novel by Ibi Kaslik)
 The Art of Starving (2017 novel by Sam J. Miller)
 The Cat Ate My Gymsuit (1974 novel by Paula Danziger)
 The Best Little Girl in the World (1979 novel by Steven Levenkron)
 Thinner (1984 novel by Stephen King as "Richard Bachman")
 Wintergirls (2009 novel by Laurie Halse Anderson)
 Worthy of Love (2019 novel by Andre Fenton)

Novels about eating disorders
Films about eating disorders
Mental health in fiction